Jane Jowitt (14 May 17703 August 1846) was an Anglo-Irish poet and memoirist. Born in Dublin to some wealth, she moved to England following the Irish Rebellion of 1798. Due to her Irish ancestry, Jowitt was denied work upon her arrival in Liverpool. She explains in her Memoirs (1844) how she travelled by foot from Liverpool to London.

Jowitt spent time in a number of English cities following her journey to London. She eventually settled in Sheffield. There, she worked odd jobs and gained some notice as a poet, primarily as a writer of memorials for local eminences. Her best-known poem at the time was written in memory of the wife of "Earl Fitzwilliam", presumably either Charlotte Ponsonby or Louisa Molesworth, the wives of William Fitzwilliam, 4th Earl Fitzwilliam (1748–1833).

Works 
 "Lines on the Death of the Rev. T. Cotterill" (1823)
 "On the Approaching Marriage of Queen Victoria" (1840)

Notes

Sources 

1770 births
1846 deaths
19th-century English women
19th-century women writers
Writers from Dublin (city)
English memoirists
19th-century English poets
19th-century Irish poets